Mekinje may refer to:
 Mekinje, Kamnik, a settlement in the Municipality of Kamnik, Upper Carniola, Slovenia
 Mekinje nad Stično, a settlement in the Municipality of Ivančna Gorica, Lower Carniola, Slovenia